Neritopsis radula is a species of sea snail, a marine gastropod mollusk in the family Neritopsidae.

Description

Distribution
Indo-Pacific:
 Aldabra
 Madagascar
 Mascarene Basin
 Mauritius
 Red Sea

References

External links

Neritopsidae
Gastropods described in 1758
Taxa named by Carl Linnaeus